Instruments used specially in pathology are as follows:

Instrument list

Gallery

References

Medical equipment
Pathology